SWR Vokalensemble is the vocal ensemble of the broadcaster Südwestrundfunk (SWR), based in Stuttgart, Germany. It was founded in 1946 as Südfunk-Chor Stuttgart in 1946 to perform studio work for Süddeutscher Rundfunk (SDR) which merged in 1998 with the Südwestfunk to form the SWR.Redigera wikitext

The ensemble was awarded the Echo Klassik in both 2011 and 2012.

Conductors
Marinus Voorberg (1975–81) 
Klaus Martin Ziegler (1981–1986)
Rupert Huber (1990–2000) 
Marcus Creed (2003-2020)
Yuval Weinberg since 2020

References

External links 
Official site 
SWR Vokalensemble Stuttgart 

Südwestrundfunk
German orchestras
1946 establishments in Germany